Niger national football team results is list of Niger national football team fixtures and results.

These are the fixtures and results of the Niger national football team:

Fixtures

1964

1965

1967

1969

1970

1972

1975

1976

1979

1980

1981

1982

1983

1984

1986

1987

1988

1990

1991

1992

1993

1994

1995

1996

1998

2000

2002

2003

2006

2007

2008

2010

2011

2012

2013

References

External links 
 Niger on FIFA.com

Results